Gerrit-Jan Mulder, known professionally as Brainpower (born 5 February 1975), is a Dutch rapper who writes, records and performs in both English as well as his native Dutch. He was born in Belgium and grew up in the Netherlands. He started making music in the eighties and spent his time making a name for himself in the 2001. Since 1990, he released six solo studio albums, one live album CD/DVD set a greatest hits box and a few other successful side projects.

Early life
Gertjan Mulder was born in Antwerp, Belgium as the son of a progressive Dutch minister and a Dutch mother. He was raised in Alphen aan den Rijn in the Netherlands, where he became a fan of hip hop and rap. He started rapping in the mid eighties, imitating heroes like Run DMC, and Eric B & Rakim. He wrote his first rap song in 1988. He moved back to the place where his mother was born, Amsterdam, in the early 1990s.

Career

1998-2000
In 1998, he entered the Grote Prijs van Nederland, a national talent show for Dutch musicians, in the category of hip hop, winning in four out of five awards, including both the grand jury award and the public appreciation award.

In 1999, he was featured on the Top-40 hit, Extince track Zoete Inval ("Sweet Incursion"), with several other Dutch-language rap artists. In 2000, Brainpower was both seen and heard in the video clip of the song Als niet Als ("If not If"), by the renowned pop /reggae musicians of classic Dutch supergroup  Doe Maar. In that same year, he had his first solo hit-song and video, Door Merg en Brain ("Through Marrow and Brain").

2001
February 2001, Brainpower released his first album, named after the hit single Door Merg en Brain. It contains a number of songs. some basic boombap Hip Hop, and some with an emotional touch, like the critically acclaimed and now famous Je Moest Waarschijnlijk Gaan ("You Probably had to Go"), referring to the suicide killing of one of his best friends. Ten years later the track is considered iconic and is known to comfort many people in times of mourning. four singles and videos are taken from the album and Brainpower tours the whole year 'round.

2002
In 2002, Brainpower released his second album Verschil Moet Er Zijn. Dansplaat ("Dance Track") was the first single to be released, and it swiftly topped the charts in both the Netherlands and Belgium. The single broke records, debuting at #1 on many charts. In the same year, Brainpower won two Dutch Awards (TMF Awards for Best NL Hip Hop Act & Silver Harp for most promising Artist) and also an MTV Award for best Dutch act. He is the only solo MC out of the Benelux ever to win such accolades. Brainpower continues to push the envelope for Dutch and Belgian Hip Hop and has even collaborated with Hip Hop legend Nas.

2003
In 2003, Brainpower won a second TMF Award as well as an Edison Award (Dutch Grammy's) for Best National Hip Hop act. Brainpower also released a two-disc DVD/CD containing live versions of many of the songs of his first two albums performed LIVE for the Box PURE Sessions. The rapper performed with a 7-piece band and a string section of 5, plus had guest appearances by (long time Prince sax player) Candy Dulfer and Berget Lewis. The second album sparked an 18-month tour including shows in 7 countries. This stands as the longest tour in Dutch Hip Hop History to coincide with one album.

2004
In 2002 he started a new project called ADHD, altering the acronym's meaning to Aanbevolen Dagelijkse Hoeveelheid Dopeness ("Daily Recommended Dosage of Dopeness"). The group recorded their album in 2002-2003 and released it in 2004 and was the first ever Rap Group out of the Netherlands to have their own sneaker. Brainpower also wins his third consecutive TMF Award for Best NL Hip Hop Act and his first MOBO Award in London, UK, (for Best Urban TV Show) for his Hip Hop TV show MTV Raw, which he hosts with Too Tall & DJ TLM. Brainpower was asked to remix the Beastie Boys song 'Triple Trouble' and his remix ends up as a B-side for the Belgian CD-Single Release on EMI.

2005
In 2005, Brainpower returned with the hit-single Even Stil ("Moment of Silence"), also the title of the new album. He plays 20 big festivals throughout the Benelux and wins his second MOBO Award. This time he wins in the category Best Live Act. He is also part of a huge production for a single to raise money to help the victims of the 2004 tsunami. The song is a #1 hit and all profits go to charity.

2006
In 2006 the rapper released a book/DVD 'Tekst & Uitleg' about his songs and specifically about his serious yet witty and often intensely emotional lyricism. He then was approached by Coca-Cola to record an album with young upcoming talent and A&R these artists. This project made him appear on over 12 million Coke cans bottles. the only Dutch rapper to ever have his own coke can. He also performed nine times at Ahoy, making him the first Dutch rapper to have performed at the legendary Rotterdam venue for 30 times. Furthermore, he plays a small role (as himself) in the Platinum movie 'Afblijven'. He also features on the soundtrack. When the DVD drops, it goes double platinum.

2007
In 2007 he creates the hit record 'Non Stop' with popular DJ duo The Partysquad. The track reaches the #1 spot in many Urban charts and Top 10 of the Top 40, it now has over 4 million views online and was an instant classic.

2008
Never one to sit back and take time off, Brainpower returns in 2008 with a double album project of two albums released on the same day: 19 April sees the birth of 'Hart' & 'Hard'. Both records end up as (his fourth & fifth) Top 20 hit albums. Ten years after his first Theatre Tour in 1998 with Made In Da Shade, he returns to theatres to embark on a successful 22-date tour throughout the Netherlands.

At the end of 2008 Brainpower is awarded with the State Lifetime Achievement Award for his ongoing impact on the Dutch Music scene and especially his tireless efforts to help Hip Hop be  considered for the wonderful mature and serious genre it is, in a small country culturally rooted in rock music. His album finally reaches Gold Status after 6 years. It is one of three Dutch Rap Albums to ever go gold.

2009
In 2009, he released his Greatest Hits Box Set, consisting of 2 CD's and 1 DVD with all 30 videos he has released over the years. The set is titled 'Mijn Manier' ('My Way') and 19 September sees the first gig of an intense 36-date Tour throughout the Benelux. Animation studio LEMONADE and Advertisement Agency DSRPT develop a limited edition Brainpower Vinyl Art Figure especially for the cover of this Greatest hits Box Set.

He won two platinum awards: A triple Platinum Award for being the best selling Dutch language solo MC of all time. Another one for Platinum sales in Belgium and his 2002 Hit Single also reaches gold status in Belgium.

2010
In 2010 Brainpower performs with reggae/dancehall legend King Yellowman in Jamaica, and played selected festivals throughout the Netherlands & Belgium  He dropped 'Dub & Dwars'  a record containing re-recorded reggae versions of his biggest tunes. With superb riddims, partially recorded in Jamaica, produced by the Fire House Crew and Dutch producer Asher E. as well as Brainpower himself, the album hits the #1 spot in both the Reggae charts for iTunes as well as BOL. In November, he dropped a track and a video with Jean Grae. December 2010 marks the rapper's first Cali performance when he plays at The Viper Room on Sunset Boulevard in Los Angeles (USA).

2011
On 16 April he released the song and video for "Mic Bizniz" featuring Jamaican Music  Legend Yellowman, often referred to as The King of Dancehall. There is also a mini documentary Called Amsterdam To Kingston featuring exclusive footage of Brainpower performing with Yellowman and an interview with Reggae Legend John Holt amongst others. The single was not only a digital release, but also came out as a 7-inch on Yellow colored vinyl for Record Store Day.

In August he put out a new song and video called 'Light It Up' which was picked up for use in 'Body Language', a movie in which Brainpower also plays a small role as a cab-driver. The movie hit #1 in the Netherlands. 30 September saw the release of a new song "People", the first single of the upcoming album, for which the accompanying video was shot in New York.

2012
In 2012 Brainpower performs in Europe & the Dutch Caribbean and releases several tracks, like 'Sometimes' (also featured in the 'Body Language' movie), plus two collaborations in Dutch: 'Een Mooi Bericht' ft Anthony Heidweiller, a collab with an opera singer via the world renown Concertgebouw, one of the best venue's in the world.

In the summer of 2012 he dropped the free EP 'The New York Sessions' featuring Jean Grae, Mr Len, Ced Gee of the Ultramagnetic MC's & more. The same year, he became an Ambassador for F.E.L.I.S. A Multi Functional center in Curaçao (Dutch Caribbean) that helps to support children and also combats short term and long term poverty. Famous Surinam/Dutch TV personality Jorgen Raymann fully supports Brainpower & F.E.L.I.S. Even Rohan Marley, son of reggae legend Bob Marley donates some stuff to the Foundation.
He served as an ambassador for the National Sports Week in the Netherlands, motivating the youth to work out.

Brainpower gets his first Hollywood movie placement in August 2012. On 24 August, the movie Thunderstruck is released in the US. It features one of Brainpower's unreleased songs.

2013
On 10 December, the Collabs EP, a collection of songs, recorded with some of the many great artists Brainpower grew up listening to, was released. On November 15, one of Brainpower’s songs, Mijn Manier, was featured on the podcast Welcome To Night Vale as the weather for the episode Lazy Day.

2014
He worked with DJ duo Moombahteam on the song 'Drop That Kick' - the song gets a warm reception is a success even ending up at #3 in the iTunes top 100 in Cambodia. After playing festivals in the summer of 2014, Brainpower releases his new single "Troubled Soul" on 3 October. The song's rap lyrics were all written by Brainpower himself, lyrics for the book were written by Brainpower & TJ, and produced by himself and TJ. The video for this song is actually a short film written and directed by upcoming director Ruwan Heggelman. On 17 December, a new single (and video) called "Rock" was released.

2015
Both singles are taken from the new album Determination, released by 19 January 2015. On 6 February, his 2005 album, Even Stil was released in the Universal Music Deluxe Edition series.  
Both the new album and the re-issued one entered the Top 100 charts. On 27 February, a new video is released for the song "Don't Let Go" ft Keith John. Brainpower has wrapped up a 75 date tour that ended on 1 June 2015.

Brainpower is one of the first artists to ever release a full stereoscopic Virtual Reality music video experience. In June he finished his translation of Shakespeare's Othello. Theatre Group ZEP asked him to make a modern-day rap version of the classic play. The play premiered on 29 September 2015.

2016
In June he finishes his translation of Shakespeare's 'Hamlet'. Theatre Group ZEP asked him to make a modern-day rap version of the classic play. The play premiers on 30 September 2016 to rave reviews and that day is the start of a 70-date tour.

Brainpower writes songs with longtime friends Orange Grove, a St Maarten-based Reggae-rock crossover band, and tours the Caribbean with them throughout the summer of 2016. they play Aruba, Curaçao, Bonaire, St Maarten & St Barths. His brand new single 'All The Same' featuring Orange Grove is currently getting airplay by dozens of radio stations in multiple countries. The official video release is on 28 October.

2017
Brainpower tours throughout the year to celebrate the 15th Anniversary of his groundbreaking album 'Verschil Moet er Zijn' and also releases a Limited Anniversary Edition of that record. December 2017 he releases his first signature microphone with sEelectronics - the Limited Brainpower V7 microphone

2018
In January and February Brainpower performs during 14 sold-out shows in front of 190,000 people as part of the Vrienden Van Amstel concept. On 29 March he performs as the first Hip Hop Artist ever in a popular Live TV Show called the Passion. The show has over 3.7 million viewers. In April he wins the Global Peace Song Award for the song 'All The Same' in the category Hip Hop. Amongst the Jury Panel members is Stewart Copeland from iconic band The Police.

That summer his song 'Animal Sauvage' ends up in the global #1 Blockbuster 'The Equalizer 2', directed by Antoine Fuqua and starring Denzel Washington. Antoine's team asked Brainpower to deliver music for this film.

2019
Brainpower releases 14 singles. Also, a greatest hits tape was released called '1999-2019 - The Best Of Brainpower', which, at first, was ONLY available as part of an art piece by Tilburg artist HIPPESHIT013. The art piece is a portrait of Brainpower painted over 160 Gold cassettes and is called: The Golden Tapes Session.

2020
This year, the prolific artist releases 15 singles and embarks on a club tour. Due to the pandemic, and lots of rescheduling, this tour ends late 2021.

2021
In 2021 his 9th studio 'Barlito's Way' is released on April 27th, known as King's Day in Holland. November 26th a Deluxe Edition with 10 extra tracks is released. His debut album 'Door Merg & Brain' is released on double-vinyl in 3 colorways for Record Store Day and sells out in seconds. On Black Friday, three new colorways are released. There is also a Best Of album dropped, 'BARS: The Best Of Brainpower' as a Vinyl exclusive in three colorways.

2022
His sophomore album 'Verschil Moet Er Zijn' is released as a 20th Anniversary Deluxe Concerto Edition in 2 elaborate double vinyl versions with slipmats on Sept 30th. 'Verschil Moet Er Zijn - The 20th anniversary Bonus Bundle' dropped on April 27th. 'The New York Sessions 10th Anniversary Edition' came out on August 22nd. 

September 7th, Brainpower announces a new theater college tour, consisting of 26 dates.

He is currently working on two new albums

Songwriting
Brainpower co-wrote "Finsbury Park '67" with Candy Dulfer, a song that ended up #1 on the USA Smooth Jazz Chart. As a songwriter Brainpower has also co-written songs for singers like Eva Simons, Edsilia Rombley, Hansen Thomas, Brace and the classic Dutch youth project Kinderen Voor Kinderen volumes 32, 33, 34 & 37. The last three mentioned are all certified platinum.

One of his songs "Love Meee" co-written with Allan Eshuijs & Marco Rakascan ended up on Japanese band Kis-My-Ft2's latest album, that reached #1 in Japan. The album sold 350,000 copies and is certified platinum by the RIAJ.

Discography

Albums

"Door Merg & Brain" (PIAS/LYRIC, 2001) cd / 3-lp
"Door Merg & Brain" - De Lowlands Editie (PIAS/LYRIC, 2001) 2-cd
"Verschil Moet Er Zijn" (PIAS/LYRIC, 2002) cd
"Verschil Moet Er Zijn" - Re-issue met bonus track (PIAS/LYRIC, 2002) cd
"The Box P.U.R.E Session" (Live Album) (PIAS/LYRIC) cd/dvd
"Verschil Moet Er Zijn" - King Size Edition + dvd (PIAS, LYRIC)
"Even Stil" (EMI/LYRIC, 2005) cd/2-lp
"Hart/Hard" (LYRIC, 2008) 2-cd
"Hart" (LYRIC, 2008) cd
"Hard" (LYRIC, 2008) cd
"Mijn Manier: 1999 - 2009" (LYRIC/PIAS, 2009) Greatest Hits Album 2 CD/1DVD
"Dub & Dwars" (LYRIC/BLACK STAR,2010) cd
"The New York Sessions" (LYRIC, 2012) Digital release.
"Determination" (LYRIC, 2015) cd
"Even Stil - Deluxe Edition" (Universal/LYRIC, 2015) 2-cd
"Verschil Moet Er Zijn" - Limited 15th Anniversary Edition Double Gold Vinyl (Music On Vinyl / LYRIC, 2017) 2LP
"Dub & Dwars"- Limited Record Store Day Edition Single Red Vinyl(Music On Vinyl/LYRIC/BLACK STAR,2010)LP
"1999-2019 - The Best Of Brainpower" (LYRIC, 2019) Exclusive Tape release available with artwork by HIPPESHIT013.
"The Amsterdam Archives" (LYRIC, 2020) digital release 
"Barlito's Way" (LYRIC, 2021) Vinyl - 2 Editions via De Rapwinkel, plus digital release 
"Door Merg & Brain - The 20th Anniversary Bonus Bundle" (LYRIC, 2021) digital release 
"Door Merg & Brain - 20th Anniversary Edition" (LYRIC, SHLV, 2021) Double Vinyl Record Store Day Exclusive release in 3 colorways. 
"Door Merg & Brain - 20th Anniversary Edition" (LYRIC, SHLV, 2021) Double Vinyl Black Friday Exclusive repress release in 3 colorways. 
"Barlito's Way Deluxe Edition" (LYRIC, 2021) digital release
"BARS: The Best Of Brainpower" (LYRIC, SHLV 2021) Vinyl release in 3 colorways. 
"Hart" (LYRIC, SHLV, 2022) Record Store Day 2022 Double Vinyl Exclusive, 2 colorways. 
"Hard" (LYRIC, SHLV, 2022) Record Store Day 2022 Double Vinyl Exclusive, 2 colorways. 
"Verschil Moet Er Zijn - The 20th Anniversary Bonus Bundle" (LYRIC, 2022) digital release 
"Verschil Moet Er Zijn - The 20th Anniversary Deluxe Concerto Edition" (LYRIC,Concerto, SHLV 2022),2 Vinyl Editions 
"The New York Sessions 10th Anniversary Edition" (LYRIC, 2022) Digital release. Tape in 2 Editions via AppleDizzle.

EP's & Side-projects
The Freestyles Chapter tape (LYRIC, 1998)
Lyricist EP (LYRIC, 1999)
 ADHD - self-titled album of side project group ADHD (Virgin, 2004)
DatvinnikCoke Brainpower presents... collab Album for Coca-Cola (LYRIC, 2006)
The New York Sessions EP (LYRIC, 2012)
The Collabs EP (LYRIC, 2013)
 Mic Bizniz 10th Anniversary EP (LYRIC, 2021)

Singles
"De Achtervolging" Dub-plate & Cassette Single (1998)
"Lyricist" (1999)
"Zoete Inval" posse cut - Extince ft Brainpower, Murth the Man-O-Script, Yukkie B, Krecial, Skate The Great, Goldy & Scuz (1999)
Als niet Als ("If not If", 8-4-2000, with Doe Maar and Def P.)
Door Merg en Brain ("Through Marrow and Brain", 2-9-2000)
"MC Vol Overgave" (12-inch)
De Vierde Kaart ("The Fourth Card", 10-2-2001)
Wat een Jinx is ("What a Jinx Is", 23-6-2001)
Je Moest Waarschijnlijk Gaan ("You Probably had to Leave", 17-11-2001)
"Dansplaat/Alles Of Niets" 12-Inch Vinyl (2002)
Dansplaat (2002)
"Dansplaat" (Herman Van Veen Remix) (2002)
"Voel De Vibe/Daarisieweer" 12-Inch vinyl (2002)
"Dansplaat" CD-Maxi with remixes by Bastian, NigthnGael & Maniak (2002)
Voel De Vibe with B-side 'Dansplaat' Live @ Rock Werchter 2002 ("Feel the Vibe", 24-8-2002)
"Voel De Vibe" CD-Maxi with remixes by Oh Jay, Maniak & more
One Mic (remix) / Made You Look (with Nas, 14-12-2002)
Schreeuwetuit! ("Cryitoutloud", 26-4-2003)
"Beng Je Hoofd" (ADHD, 2004)
"Shouf Shouf Habibi" (ADHD, 2004)
"Pro" (12-inch, 2005)
Alles ("Everything", 2-5-2005)
"Alles" Immorales Remix (2005)
Even Stil ("Moment of Silence", 2005)
"Even Stil (Piano Remix with Giorgio Tunfort)" (exclusive single release 2005)
"Cartagena (helden)" with Ali B ft La Heroika (video only - 2005)
"Terug" ("Video Exclusive")
Vlinders ("Butterflies", 2006)
Non Stop ("Non Stop", 2007)
"The Chosen" duet with Intwine (2007)
"Cut Me Loose" with Intwine (2008)
Eigen Werk ("Own Work", 2008)
Boks Ouwe ("Box Man", 2008)
"Wees Niet Bang" (2009)
"Mijn Manier" (2009)
"Vierde Kaart Dub" (2010)
"Mind Ur Bizniz" ft. Jean Grae (2010)
"Bleedin' Organz" ft. Shabazz The Disciple (2011)
"Mic Bizniz" ft. Yellowman (2011)
"Emcee Fluid" ft. Block McCloud, Mr Metaphore aka Marc Bars & Thirstin Howl III (2012)
"Two MC's" ft. Kice Of Course
"Light It Up" (2011)
"People" (2011)
"Een Mooi Bericht" ft Anthony Heidweiller (2012)
"Sometimes" (2012)
"Dubbelportret" with Zanillya Farrell (2012)
"Hing, Hing, Hing" (2012) Digital & Limited CD Wallet
"Hing, Hing, Hing - Dushi Korsou Remix" (2012) Digital & B-side Limited CD Wallet
"Hing, Hing, Hing - Dushi Korsou Remix Rockorsou Speshel" ft Big D. (2012) Digital
"Boxfresh" ft Ladybug MEcca of Digable Planets (2012) Digital
"Zet "m Dan Op Repeat (Hing Remix pt 1)" ft Excellent (2012) Digital
"Zet "m Dan Op Repeat (Hing Remix pt. 2) ft Tante Es (2012) Digital
"Greenhouse" (2012) Digital
"The Universal Funk" ft PMD (of EPMD) (2013) Digital & Limited Edition Purple/White 12-inch Vinyl (Record Store Day Exclusive)
"West To The Dam" ft WC (2013) Promotional animated video for & available as part of The Collabs EP
"Troubled Soul" (2014) Digital & Promo CD Single
"Troubled Soul (Moombahteam Remix)" (2014) Digital 
"Rock" (2014) Digital
"From The Art" (2015) Video for album track
"Determination" (2015) Video for album track
"Pot Thoughts" (2015) Video for album track
"Play Happy" (2015) Video for album track
"Troubled Soul (Singing Version)" (2015) Digital
"Don't Let Go" (2015) Digital
"Nothing" (2015) Digital
"All The Same" ft Orange Grove (2016) Digital Single & Promo CD Single
"Wie Heeft" ft Tommie Christiaan (2018) Digital Single
"Animal Sauvage" ft Pharoahe Monch, Pitcho & STIX (2018) Digital Single (as heard in The Equalizer 2)
"De Bass Druipt" (2018) Digital Single
"Don't Let Go" (2018 Version) ft Keith John (2015) digitale single
"De Bass Druipt" (2018) digital single
"Elvy" featuring Philippe Lemm Trio (2018) digital single
"De Beat" (2018) digital single
"All The Same" featuring Orange Grove (Acoustic Version) [Live In The Hollywood Hills] (2018) digital single
"Instrumentaal" (2019) digital single
"Onbetaalbaar" (2019) digital single
"De Bass Druipt" (Remix) (2019) digital single
"Only When Alone" featuring Midd (2019) digital single
"Alleen Als Ik Alleen Ben" featuring Midd (2019) digital single
"Style That We Bring" featuring Crim De La Crim (2019) digital single
"Dansplaat" (Live @ Rock Werchter 2002) (2019) digital single
"Staan" (2019) digital single
"Emcee Fluid" featuring Block McCloud, Mr. Metaphore & Thirstin Howl III (2019) digital single
"Lyricist" (20th Anniversary Release) (2019) digital single
"Can't Miss It" (20th Anniversary Release) (2019) digital single
"Can't Stay" (2019) digital single
"Unity" featuring The Ichiban Don & Daylyt (2019) digital single
"1999-2019" (2019) digital single
"Type Met woorden" (2020) digital single
"Kick Snare Hi-Hat" (2004/2020) digital single
"De Niro In Casino" (2020) digital single
"Iedereen Zegt" (2020) digitale single
"West To The Dam" (2020 Remaster) (2020) digital single
"Hart Onder De Riem" (2020) digital single
"Hoopvol" (2020) digital single
"Menselijk Oordeel" (2020) digital single
2001 Brain (2020) digital single
Crockett & Tubbs (2020) digital single
Bars (2020) digital single
Tape Is Goud (2020) digital single
Barnold Schwarsenegger (2020) digital single
Braining Day (2020) digital single
Cazals & Keytars /'Cazals & Keytars (instrumental) (2020) digital single
Spreek (2021) digital single & videoclip
MC Vol Overgave 2  featuring: Niva, Millz, Sens & Kaaskous (2021) digital single & videoclip
Dichter Bij God (2021) digital single
Matt Damon In Rounders (2021) digital single
John Nada (2021) digital single
Dansplaat (2002 Remix) (2022) digital single

References

External links

1975 births
Dutch rappers
Living people
Musicians from Antwerp
MTV Europe Music Award winners